Whitesboro is an unincorporated community and census-designated place (CDP) in Le Flore County, Oklahoma, United States. The population was 250 as of the 2010 census. 

A post office opened at Whitesboro, Indian Territory on April 14, 1902.  The community took its name from Paul White, an early-day settler.  

At the time of its founding, Whitesboro was located in Wade County, a part of the Apukshunnubbee District of the Choctaw Nation.

Demographics

References

Census-designated places in Le Flore County, Oklahoma
Census-designated places in Oklahoma
Fort Smith metropolitan area